Douglas Cecil Wallace (born November 6, 1946) is a geneticist and evolutionary biologist at the University of Pennsylvania and the Children's Hospital of Philadelphia in Pennsylvania. He pioneered the use of human mitochondrial DNA as a molecular marker.

Career
Wallace earned a Bachelor of Science in Genetics and Developmental Biology at Cornell University in Ithaca, New York in 1968, a Master of Philosophy in Microbiology and Human Genetics at Yale University in New Haven, Connecticut in 1972 and a Ph.D. in Microbiology and Human Genetics at Yale University in 1975. His dissertation was titled Cytoplasmic genetics in mammalian tissue culture cells.

He remained at Yale University as a postdoctoral fellow until he was awarded a professorship (Assistant Professor) at the Stanford University School of Medicine in Stanford, California in 1976. In 1983 he became professor (Adjunct Professor) for Biochemistry, Anthropology and Pediatrics (Genetics) at the Emory University in Atlanta, Georgia. From 1996 to 2002, he was Chairperson and Senior Editor of the Mitochondrial DNA Locus-Specific Database for the Human Genome Organisation (HUGO). In 2002 he assumed a professorship of Molecular Genetics at the University of California, Irvine and founded the Center for Molecular and Mitochondrial Medicine and Genetics there. In 2006 he was awarded a visiting professorship at Academia Sinica in Taipei, Taiwan. In 2010 he became professor of Pathology and Laboratory Medicine at the University of Pennsylvania in Philadelphia and became the founding director of the Center for Mitochondrial and Epigenomic Medicine at the Children's Hospital of Philadelphia.

Work
Wallace is a pioneer in the study of mitochondrial DNA. Wallace and his colleagues introduced human mitochondrial genetics into the field of molecular genetics. In 1975, for the first time ever, Wallace could associate a genetic disorder with the mitochondrial DNA region (resistance to chloramphenicol) and in 1990 he described a mitochondrial DNA mutation as the cause of a particular form of myoclonic epilepsy. He has been instrumental in the study of the mitochondrial genome and has developed new methods for the analysis of mitochondrial DNA.

Wallace and his colleagues demonstrated that human mitochondrial DNA is inherited exclusively from the mother and reconstructed the origin and ancient migration patterns of women using variations in mitochondrial DNA sequences.

Honours and awards
 1995 Membership of the National Academy of Sciences
 1999 Metlife Foundation Award for Medical Research in Alzheimer's Disease
 2000 Passano Award (jointly with Giuseppe Attardi)
 2004 Membership of the American Academy of Arts and Sciences
 2009 Membership of the Institute of Medicine
 2012 Gruber Prize in Genetics
 2017 Benjamin Franklin Life Sciences Medal
 2017 Dr. Paul Janssen Award for Biomedical Research

See also
Recent African origin of modern humans
Mitochondrial Eve

References

Living people
1946 births
American geneticists
Evolutionary biologists
Recent African origin of modern humans
Cornell University alumni
Yale University alumni
Stanford University School of Medicine faculty
Emory University faculty
University of California, Irvine faculty
University of Pennsylvania faculty
Members of the United States National Academy of Sciences
Members of the National Academy of Medicine
Fellows of the American Academy of Arts and Sciences
Fellows of the American Academy of Microbiology
People from Cumberland, Maryland